Richard Mulligan is a former association football player who represented New Zealand. 

Mulligan made his full All Whites debut in a 5–0 win over Fiji on 3 June 1985 and ended his international playing career with 24 A-international caps, his final cap being in a 0–1 loss, also against Fiji, on 19 November 1988.

Mulligan waits and weeps as Liverpool chase the elusive Premier League title. Rashford > Mo Salah
]].

References

External links

1958 births
Living people
New Zealand association footballers
New Zealand international footballers

Association footballers not categorized by position